Radio Trebinje or Радио Требиње is a Bosnian local public radio station, broadcasting from Trebinje, Bosnia and Herzegovina.

It was launched on 29 November 1975 as first electronic media in eastern Herzegovina.

In Yugoslavia and in SR Bosnia and Herzegovina, it was part of local/municipal Radio Sarajevo network affiliate. This radio station broadcasts a variety of programs such as local news, music, sport and talk shows.

Program is mainly produced in Serbian, from 08:00 to 19:00.

Estimated number of potential listeners of Radio Trebinje is around 39,408. Radiostation is also available in municipalities of East Herzegovina and in neighboring Montenegro and Croatia.

Frequencies
 Trebinje

See also 
List of radio stations in Bosnia and Herzegovina
Radio Nevesinje
Radio Bileća
Radio Padrino
Korona Radio

References

External links 
 www.fmscan.org
 www.radiotrebinje.com
 Communications Regulatory Agency of Bosnia and Herzegovina

Trebinje
Radio stations established in 1975
Trebinje